The 1980 Volvo Grand Prix was a men's professional tennis circuit held that year. It incorporated the four grand slam tournaments, the Grand Prix tournaments. The Grand Prix circuit is a precursor to the ATP Tour.

Volvo became the new tour sponsor of the Grand Prix circuit after Colgate-Palmolive decided to end its sponsorship. Eight World Championship Tennis tournaments were incorporated into the circuit.

Schedule 
The table below shows the 1980 Volvo Grand Prix schedule.

January

February

March

April

May

June

July

August

September

October

November

December

January 1981

Standings 
The 1980 Grand Prix tournaments were divided in 12 separate point categories, ranging from the Grand Slam tournaments (350 points for the winner) to the smallest Regular Series tournaments (50 points for the winner). At the end of the year the top-ranked players received a bonus from a $750,000 bonus pool. To qualify for a bonus a player must have participated in at least three Grand Prix tournaments with a prize money of $175,000 or more as well as three tournaments with prize money of $50,000–$75,000 during weeks when a $75,000 event is scheduled.

ATP rankings 

*The official ATP year-end rankings were listed from January 4th, 1981.

List of tournament winners 
The list of winners and number of singles titles won, alphabetically by last name:
  Victor Amaya (1) Washington-2
  Vijay Amritraj (2) Newport, Bangkok
  Corrado Barazzutti (1) Cairo
  Dominique Bedel (1) Bogotá
  Björn Borg (8) Boca Raton, WCT Invitational, Nice, Monte Carlo, Las Vegas, French Open, Wimbledon, Stockholm
  Fritz Buehning (1) Sydney Outdoor
  José Luis Clerc (6) Costa Rica, South Orange, Indianapolis, Madrid, Quito, Buenos Aires
  Jimmy Connors (6) Birmingham, Philadelphia, Dallas, North Conway, Taiwan, Tokyo Indoor
  Eddie Dibbs (2) Sarasota, Boston
  Colin Dibley (1) Perth
  Peter Feigl (1) Nigeria
  Wojciech Fibak (3) Dayton, New Orleans, São Paulo
  Rolf Gehring (1) Munich
  Vitas Gerulaitis (3) Forest Hills, Stuttgart Outdoor, Melbourne Indoor
  Ángel Giménez (2) Vienna, Bournemouth
  Shlomo Glickstein (1) Hobart
  Brian Gottfried (4) Surbiton, Washington, D.C., Vienna, Paris Indoor
  Heinz Günthardt (3) Rotterdam, Johannesburg, Gstaad
  Per Hjertquist (1) Sofia
  Ivan Lendl (7) Houston, Toronto, Barcelona, Basel, Tokyo Outdoor, Hong Kong, Taiwan
  Robert Lutz (3) Columbus, Stowe, Cologne
  Mario Martínez (1) Bordeaux
  Gene Mayer (5) Denver, Metz, Los Angeles, Cleveland, San Francisco
  John McEnroe (9) Richmond WCT, Memphis, Milan, Queen's Club, US Open, Brisbane, Sydney Indoor, Wembley, WCT Challenge Cup
  Peter McNamara (1) Brussels
  Paul McNamee (1) Palm Harbor
  Adriano Panatta (1) Florence
  Víctor Pecci (1) Santiago
  Raúl Ramírez (1) Puerto Rico
  John Sadri (1) Auckland
  Howard Schoenfield (1) Tulsa
  Tomáš Šmíd (2) Stuttgart Indoor, Bologna
  Stan Smith (1) Frankfurt
  Harold Solomon (4) Baltimore WCT, Hamburg, Cincinnati, Tel Aviv
  Balázs Taróczy (3) Båstad, Hilversum, Geneva
  Brian Teacher (1) Australian Open
  Eliot Teltscher (2) Atlanta, Maui
  Guillermo Vilas (3) Rome, Kitzbühel, Palermo
  Kim Warwick (1) Johannesburg

The following players won their first title in 1980:
  Dominique Bedel Bogotá
  Per Hjertquist Sofia
  Ivan Lendl Houston
  Paul McNamee Palm Harbor

See also 
 World Championship Tennis
 1980 WTA Tour

Notes

References

External links 
 ATP 1980 archive results
 History mens professional tours

Further reading 
 

 
Grand Prix tennis circuit seasons
Grand Prix